Pseudocyphomyia is a genus of flies in the family Stratiomyidae.

Species
Pseudocyphomyia mimetica Kertész, 1916

References

Stratiomyidae
Brachycera genera
Taxa named by Kálmán Kertész
Diptera of South America